James Harry Kelly (April 23, 1942 – May 17, 2022) was an American football tight end who played three seasons in the National Football League with the Pittsburgh Steelers and Philadelphia Eagles. He was drafted by the Pittsburgh Steelers in the second round of the 1964 NFL Draft. He was also drafted by the Boston Patriots in the second round of the 1964 AFL Draft. He played college football at the University of Notre Dame and attended Clairton High School in Clairton, Pennsylvania.

References

External links
Just Sports Stats
College stats

1942 births
2022 deaths
Players of American football from Pennsylvania
American football tight ends
Notre Dame Fighting Irish football players
Pittsburgh Steelers players
Philadelphia Eagles players
Sportspeople from McKeesport, Pennsylvania